You Can't Do That on Stage Anymore, Vol. 2 is a live album by Frank Zappa. Despite the subtitle 'The Helsinki Concert', the album is not one complete concert, but was, in fact, assembled from two (and possibly three) different concerts performed in Helsinki in 1974.   The working title for this album was The Helsinki Tapes, a title more accurately reflecting the fact that the album was composed of performances from more than one show.  It is the only album of the series You Can't Do That on Stage Anymore that includes only one Frank Zappa Band, and only one location of concert. All other albums mix different bands and different time periods in the stage career of Frank Zappa.

The track listing is similar to that of Roxy & Elsewhere (1974), as are the core band personnel. The performance includes a double-speed version of "Village of the Sun", sandwiched between a later  version of "RDNZL", the first being recorded in 1972, and "Echidna's Arf (Of You)", and "Montana (Whipping Floss)", in which Zappa alters the lyrics of "Montana" in response to a request from an audience member for the Allman Brothers song "Whipping Post". (Zappa would later add "Whipping Post" to his band's repertoire in response to this request.) The guitar solo in the One Size Fits All (1975) version of "Inca Roads" is an edited extract of the solo presented here.

Track listing
All songs written, composed and arranged by Frank Zappa, except where noted.

Personnel
 Frank Zappa – lead guitar, vocals
 Napoleon Murphy Brock – saxophone, flute, vocals
 George Duke – keyboards, vocals
 Ruth Underwood – percussion
 Tom Fowler – bass guitar
 Chester Thompson – drums

References

External links
 Lyrics and information
 Release details

1988 live albums
Frank Zappa live albums
Rykodisc live albums
Sequel albums